William Henry Wood was a British trade union leader.

Biography
Wood was a compositor, and became the Secretary of the Manchester Typographical Society, serving until 1879.  In 1864, he was elected as the first Secretary of the Manchester Trades Council.

A keen trade unionist, Wood played a prominent role in two national union conferences: in Sheffield in 1866, and in London in 1867.  With Samuel Caldwell Nicholson, he was inspired to create the Trades Union Congress (TUC), in frustration at the indifference of the Congress of the National Association for the Promotion of Social Science to trade union activities.

As Nicholson did not attend the first meeting of the TUC, Wood was elected as its first Secretary.  He held the post for only one year, after which he was replaced by George Potter.

References

British trade union leaders
General Secretaries of the Trades Union Congress
Year of birth missing
Year of death missing
Presidents of the Trades Union Congress